Tesis is a 1996 Spanish crime horror thriller film. It is the feature debut of director Alejandro Amenábar and was written by Amenabar and Mateo Gil. The film was made while he was studying at the Complutense University in Madrid. The film won seven 1996 Goya Awards including the award for Best Film, Best Original Screenplay and Best Director. It stars  Ana Torrent, Fele Martínez and Eduardo Noriega.

Plot 
Ángela, a university student in Madrid, is planning to write a thesis on audiovisual violence and the family. Her commuter train is evacuated after a man commits suicide by jumping in front of the train. While being led out of the station, Ángela moves toward the tracks in an attempt to see the man's remains. At her school, Ángela asks her thesis director, Professor Figueroa, to help her find the most violent films in the school's library, and seeks out a fellow student, Chema, who is known for collecting violent and pornographic videos. While Ángela watches a violent film with Chema, Figueroa finds a tape hidden in the school's audiovisual archives. The next day, Ángela finds Figueroa dead of an apparent asthma attack in the screening room and retrieves the tape. A younger professor, Castro, takes over the supervision of Ángela's thesis project. At Chema's house, Ángela discovers the stolen tape is a snuff film in which a woman is tortured, killed, and disemboweled. Chema recognizes the victim is a student from their university named Vanessa, who went missing two years previously. He is able to determine that the killer used a specific model of Sony camera with a digital zoom feature, and that the film was shot in someone's garage.

At the library, Ángela sees a handsome young man named Bosco using the type of camera Chema identified. When she leaves, he pursues and catches up to her. Bosco notices that Ángela has newspaper clippings about Vanessa's disappearance and states that he has information about the case. Ángela pretends she is filming a report about the disappearance and asks to interview Bosco about it. In the interview, Bosco insists that Vanessa must have run away with a boyfriend because she sent a note to her family saying that she was in love. Ángela is willing to accept Bosco's innocence, but Chema tells her that he is a psychopath. Once home, Ángela realizes that Bosco is inside the house waiting for her. Although she is initially frightened, Bosco charms her family and they invite him to stay for dinner. Once alone, Bosco attempts to seduce Ángela but she resists his advances. At the school, Chema asks a security guard to see the security tape of the video library on the night of Figueroa's death. That night, Ángela has a dream that Bosco threatens her with a knife, performs oral sex on her while videotaping it, and then stabs her.

Castro questions Ángela about Figueroa's death, showing her a security footage of her discovering the body and taking the videotape. As Ángela is about to admit why she took the tape, Chema calls and tells her to leave Castro's office immediately, saying that he is involved in the snuff film. Castro fails to catch Ángela as she flees his office. Bosco's girlfriend, Yolanda, confronts Ángela and explains that she, Vanessa, Bosco, and Chema, who was once a friend of Bosco, had gone to a series of director's workshops with Castro two years previously. Yolanda states that she left when they made Vanessa take off her clothes for a short film, that Chema was obsessed with snuff films, and that she believes he killed Vanessa after the workshop ended. Later, Chema admits to Ángela that he knew Bosco, but claims he also left the workshop when things got out of hand. At night, Chema shows Ángela a hidden tunnel he has discovered in the school's video library. In a room off the tunnel, they find shelves of video tapes like the one of Vanessa, indicating that many other women may have been murdered in other snuff films. Suddenly the door to the tunnel closes and they are locked inside. Fearing they will be killed, Chema and Ángela walk further into the tunnel with only matches to light their way. They find an editing room where they fall asleep in each other's arms.

When Ángela wakes, the lights have come back on and Chema is gone. She walks through a doorway and is chloroformed. She awakens tied to a chair facing Castro, who is videotaping her. Castro tells that he only edited the snuff videos, but that he has to kill her and that her death will be painless and much quicker than Vanessa's. As he aims a gun at Ángela's head, Chema appears and wrestles with him. The gun goes off, killing Castro. Ángela and Chema escape. Once at her house, Ángela's father tells her that her sister, Sena, is at a party with Bosco. Terrified, Ángela hurries to the party. Once there, Sena refuses to leave with Ángela, insisting that Bosco is in love with her. In order to persuade her sister to leave, Ángela approaches Bosco and passionately kisses him. The next day, Ángela tells Chema they need to go to the police. Although initially reluctant, Chema agrees but takes a shower before leaving. While he is in the bathroom, Ángela finds a Sony zoom camera among Chema's belongings, which contains a tape showing Ángela from outside her bedroom window. Convinced that Chema has been stalking her, Ángela flees. She goes back home to advise Sena to remain safe, then takes a taxi to Bosco's house. She is followed by a figure in a black rain coat.

At Bosco's house, he and Ángela talk about their relationship. Suddenly, the lights go out and Bosco goes downstairs to check on the power. When Ángela follows him, she finds him lying on the floor; Chema has followed her to the house and knocked out Bosco. However, Bosco revives and in the struggle that ensues, beats Chema to the ground. While Bosco fetches rope to tie up Chema, he tells Ángela to look in Bosco's garage. Ángela does so and recognizes the room from the snuff film of Vanessa. Bosco ties up Ángela and explains how he intends to torture and kill her. However, she cuts her bonds with a knife, slashes Bosco, grabs his gun, and shoots him dead. Ángela visits a recovering Chema in the hospital. On the television in his room, an announcer states that the bodies of six women were found at Bosco's home. Ángela gives Chema a book inscribed with an invitation to have coffee with her and tells him she is going to abandon her thesis. As they leave, the announcer states that footage from a snuff film will be shown on air.

Cast 
Main cast:

Critical response 
As a film made by a film student about film students, much of Tesis is metafilmic and comments on the Spanish film industry, Hollywood influence and the voyeuristic nature of the horror and snuff genres. Following the aesthetic of the American horror genre, Angela operates as the "Final Girl",  or resourceful female protagonist that defies stereotypical feminine traits. Although Tesis fits the suspenseful mold of a Hollywood horror flick rather than its symbol-rich European counterpart, according to European film critic Marguerite la Caze, Tesis has a thesis: "human beings, no matter how well-meaning, are attracted to violence and death in all its forms".

Tesis has generated much critical analysis due to its study of the fascination of violence. Film critic Leora Lev discusses Angela's ethical rejection and simultaneous attraction to violent images as this film's primary conversation. Lev states that Angela's psychosexual conflict with both the snuff film and the murderer, Bosco, is emblematic of the culture that consumes violent films and reality television series.

On the film-critics aggregator  Rotten Tomatoes, Thesis has a critical rating of 83% based on 12 reviews.

References

External links

“Snuffing” Hollywood: Transmedia Horror in Tesis, movie analysis at Senses of Cinema
 Tesis, at Club Cultura

1995 films
1990s Spanish-language films
Films set in Madrid
Films shot in Madrid
Madrid in fiction
1990s psychological thriller films
Spanish detective films
Films directed by Alejandro Amenábar
Best Film Goya Award winners
Films about snuff films
Films with screenplays by Mateo Gil
1990s Spanish films
Spanish psychological thriller films